Sea of Stars is an upcoming role-playing video game by Sabotage Studio. A prequel to The Messenger (2018), it is set to be released for macOS, Microsoft Windows, Nintendo Switch, PlayStation 4, PlayStation 5, Xbox One and Xbox Series X/S on August 29, 2023.

Premise
Sea of Stars is a role-playing game (RPG) centered around two heroes named Valere and Zale, who use the power of the sun and moon to fight against an alchemist. Gameplay includes elements of puzzle-solving and turn-based combat, with players able to control up to six player characters. The game is inspired by role-playing games such as Illusion of Gaia, Breath of Fire, and Chrono Trigger and  features sailing mechanics, side quests, and combat focused around finding the "elemental weaknesses" of enemies. Sea of Stars is located in the same setting as The Messenger, but is set thousands of years before the events of the latter game.

Development
Sea of Stars was announced on March 19, 2020, with an expected release date set for 2022. First launched as a project on Kickstarter, Sabotage intended to develop an RPG that was more ambitious than The Messenger. Creative director Thierry Boulanger said that Sabotage wanted to expand and tell a new story in the same game world, using a new genre unlike the metroidvania style of the first game. He wanted to include "higher stakes" with six characters and exploration that differed from the linear nature of The Messenger. The game is being scored by Eric W. Brown with additional tracks from Chrono Trigger composer Yasunori Mitsuda. In June 2022, Sabotage announced a delay of the game into 2023. In December 2022, it was announced for a mid-2023 release. In February 2023, Sabatoge announced an August release.

References

External links
 

Upcoming video games scheduled for 2023
Indie video games
MacOS games
Nintendo Switch games
PlayStation 4 games
PlayStation 5 games
Retro-style video games
Role-playing video games
Single-player games
Video games developed in Canada
Video games scored by Yasunori Mitsuda
Windows games